Foreign relations exist between Austria and Saudi Arabia.  Both countries had diplomatic contact since 7 July 1880, with the opening of an Austrian consulate in Jeddah (then under Ottoman occupation).  Official and direct diplomatic relations were established on 10 September 1957.
Today, Austria has an embassy in Riyadh and Saudi Arabia has an embassy in Vienna.

In October 2001, the President of Austria Thomas Klestil paid a state visit to Saudi Arabia.

In April 2004, then Crown Prince Abdullah of Saudi Arabia paid a state visit to Austria.

In March 2006, the President of Austria Heinz Fischer paid a state visit to Saudi Arabia.

See also 
 Foreign relations of Austria
 Foreign relations of Saudi Arabia
 Austria–Turkey relations

Notes and references

External links 
  Austria Ministry of Foreign Affairs: list of bilateral treaties (in German only)
  Austrian embassy in Riyadh
  Saudi embassy in Vienna (in Arabic and German only)

 
 
Saudi Arabia
Bilateral relations of Saudi Arabia